The  Nkenda–Fort Portal–Hoima High Voltage Power Line is a high voltage electricity power line, in operation, connecting the high voltage substation at Nkenda, Kasese District, to another high voltage substation at Kabaale, Buseruka sub-county, Hoima District, all in the Western Region of Uganda.

Location

Overview
This power line is planned to evacuate the power from a number of mini-hydro power projects in the Western Region districts of Bundibugyo, Bunyangabu, Kasese, Hoima and Masindi. It is also planned to evacuate power from the proposed Nzizi Thermal Power Station. The power that this power line evacuates is sold to the Uganda Electricity Transmission Company Limited and integrated into the national electric grid.

Construction
KEC International is the main contractor for this project. The supervising engineering company is "Ficthner Gmbh". The contract for construction of the associated substations was awarded to "Shan-dong Taikai Power Engineering Company Limited. The government of Norway donated US$54 million towards the completion of this project. In 2013, the Ugandan government borrowed US$23 million from the French Development Agency to finance this power line. Construction began in 2016, with completion in July 2018 and public commissioning on 14 August 2018.

See also
 Energy in Uganda
 List of power stations in Uganda

References

External links
Website of the Uganda Electricity Transmission Company Limited
Six megawatts of power lying idle at Hoima plant As of 14 October 2013.

High-voltage transmission lines in Uganda
Energy infrastructure in Africa
Energy in Uganda
2018 establishments in Uganda